Iron Lung are an American hardcore punk duo based in Seattle, Washington, United States. The band formed in 1999 in Reno, Nevada, and is currently in Seattle, after spending some time in Oakland, California. Live, the band has toured extensively across the U.S., Asia, Australia and Europe. They have released music on several labels including Prank Records, 625 Thrashcore, and their own label, Iron Lung Records. In recent years, the band has collaborated with other members of the hardcore punk and powerviolence scene, including Hatred Surge and Dave Bailey, formerly of Running for Cover. In 2009, an album titled Public Humiliation was released; a three-way collaboration between Iron Lung and Kortland and Ward's side projects, Pig Heart Transplant and Walls respectively. The recording is of a one-off live performance from Halloween 2008. Jon Kortland is also half of the art project Feeding, which has made artwork for several Iron Lung, Walls and PHT releases, as well as album covers for several other bands.

Discography

Splits
 Split 7" w/ Teen Cthulhu
 Split 7" w/ Brainoil
 Split LP/CD w/ Lana Dagales
 Split 7" w/ BG
 Split 5" w/ Quattro Stagioni
 Split 7" w/ Scurvy Bastards
 Split LP/CD w/ Shank
 Split 7" w/ Lords of Light
 Split 7" w/ Agents of Abhorrence
 Split LP w/ Withdrawal Method (unreleased, test pressings only)
 Split 7" w/ The Process
 Split LP w/ The Endless Blockade
 Split 2x7" w/ Hatred Surge, Mind Eraser and Scapegoat – Brutal Supremacy (Painkiller Records)

EPs
 Demonstrations in Pressure and Volume 7"
 "Cancer" b/w "Life of Pain" (Black Flag cover)
 Saboteur 7"

Albums
 Life. Iron Lung. Death.
 Sexless//No Sex
 Live at Supersonic 2009
 White Glove Test
 Savagery

Demos and tapes
 10 Song 2000 demo
 Iron Lung Comedy Hour Live
 Enterruption Hermetic Archival Series 1
 Cold Storage I cassette/CD
 Cold Storage II cassette

Collaborations
 Iron Lung/Hatred Surge – Broken: A Collaboration 7"
 Walls/Pig Heart Transplant/Iron Lung – Public Humiliation LP
 Dead Language – Dead Language LP

References

External links
Iron Lung on Discogs
Iron Lung on Last.fm
Iron Lung on Myspace

Musical groups from Seattle
Hardcore punk groups from Nevada
American grindcore musical groups
Rock music duos
Musical groups established in 1999
Powerviolence groups
1999 establishments in Washington (state)